is a Japanese professional shogi player ranked 5-dan.

Shogi professional
In October 2016, Ide defeated apprentice professional 3-dan Yūta Ishikawa 2 games to 1 to win the 6th . Ide made it to the championship match of the same tournament the following year, but lost the 7th Kakogawa Seiryū Tournament to Takuya Nishida 2 games to 1.

Promotion history
Ide's promotion history is as follows:
 6-kyū: September 2003 
 3-dan: October 2009 
 4-dan: April 1, 2016
 5-dan: February 25, 2021

Titles and other championships
Ide has yet to appear in a major title match, but he has won one non-major title championship.

References

External links
ShogiHub: Professional Player Info · Ide, Junpei

Japanese shogi players
Living people
Professional shogi players
People from Yokohama
Professional shogi players from Kanagawa Prefecture
1991 births
Kakogawa Seiryū